Decha Kraisart (born 24 January 1981 in Saraburi, Thailand) is a Thai professional motorcycle racer. He currently races in the Asia Road Race SS600 Championship, aboard a Yamaha YZF-R6.

Career statistics

Grand Prix motorcycle racing

By season

Races by year

Supersport World Championship

Races by year

References

External links

1981 births
Living people
Decha Kraisart
Moto2 World Championship riders
Decha Kraisart
125cc World Championship riders
Decha Kraisart